The 2006–07 Serbian Cup season was the first staging of Serbia's football knockout competition. It was the first tournament that Serbia ever held as an independent football association. Montenegro also held its first independent cup tournament in the 2006–07 season. The predecessor competition was the Serbia and Montenegro Cup until that state dissolved. Heavy favorites Red Star defeated Vojvodina to win the tournament and become Serbia's first cup winner and later clinched the Meridian SuperLiga title to claim its tenth domestic double.

Individual awards

Round of 32

Round of 16

Quarter-finals

Semi-finals

Final
The Final was held at Partizan's Stadium on May 15, 2007 in Belgrade, Serbia. The final pitted Serbian powerhouse Red Star against the up-and-coming side FK Vojvodina. Vojvodina jumped out to the brighter start, with great attacking play from midfielder Milan Davidov running the show and wing-back Nikola Petković causing problems down the left.

Striker Ranko Despotović came close in the 10th minute after a darting run by Petković luckily for Red Star their veteran defender Dušan Basta foiled a flowing move with a last-gasp tackle with keeper Ivan Ranđelović beaten.

Red Star responded with a Nenad Milijaš free kick that almost crept in and Milan Purović`s close-range header before Koroman broke the deadlock on the hour with a crisp shot from the edge of the penalty box.

Vojvodina were on the back foot in the second half and failed to muster a single shot on target as Davidov faded and talented Montenegrin playmaker Igor Burzanović ran their defence ragged at the other end. Dušan Đokić sealed the win with a delightful 85th-minute lob after a defence-splitting pass from Burzanović.

"We couldn't break them down in the first half but our lads responded well after the halftime chat in the dressing room and we dedicate this victory to our fans," said Red Star's delighted coach Boško Djurovski.

Koroman also praised the home section of the 25,000 crowd and said Red Star would now aim for success in Europe.

"Our fans were like an extra man on the pitch again and we want to treat them to some Champions League football next season."

External links
 Official website

Serbian Cup seasons
Serbian Cup
Cup